Angelique Kerber won her 14th WTA Tour singles title, defeating Kaja Juvan in the final, 7–6(7–5), 6–7(0–7), 7–6(7–5). The entire match lasted 3 hours and 16 minutes. 

Barbora Krejčíková was the defending champion but withdrew before the tournament began.

This was Samantha Stosur's last official tournament in singles. She lost in the first round to Harmony Tan.

Seeds

Draw

Finals

Top half

Bottom half

Qualifying

Seeds

Qualifiers

Lucky losers

Qualifying draw

First qualifier

Second qualifier

Third qualifier

Fourth qualifier

References 

 Main draw
 Qualifying draw

 

2022 Internationaux de Strasbourg - 1
2022 WTA Tour